The Musée d'Art Moderne et Contemporain de Strasbourg (MAMCS, Museum of Modern and Contemporary Art) is an art museum in Strasbourg, France, which was founded in 1973 and opened in its own building in November 1998.

One of the largest of its kind in France, the museum houses extensive collections of paintings, sculpture, graphic arts, multimedia and design from the period between 1870 (Impressionism) and today, as well as a wide range of pieces in its photographic library. It owns a total of 18,000 works. Numerous exhibitions are organized annually, showing either the works of a particular artist or a retrospective of an artistic genre. The art library of the municipal museums (Bibliothèque d'art des musées municipaux), the art book shop of the municipal museums (Librairie d'art des musées municipaux) and a multi-purpose auditorium for conferences, films and concerts are also found in the same building. The spacious roof terrace accommodates a museum cafe.

Building 
The municipal collection of modern and contemporary art of the city of Strasbourg has been constantly enlarged and enriched since 1871 and the founding of the Reichsland Alsace-Lorraine. There had already been plans to erect an independent museum since the 1960s.

The building was constructed on the left bank of the river Ill from 1995 until 1998. It was designed by the Parisian architect Adrien Fainsilber, who had already designed the Cité des Sciences et de l'Industrie in the French capital. The exhibition and usable floor space open out on both sides of a central glass covered walk, which is conceived in cathedral-like dimensions, with an interior length of 104 meters and an interior height of 22 meters. A horse sculpture (4 meters high), Hortus conclusus, by the Italian artist Mimmo Paladino is placed on the museum's roof. The building is located at the edge of the old quarter of the city (Petite France), in front of the administrative center of the department (École nationale d'administration) and near the architecturally important baroque weir Barrage Vauban and the medieval tower bridge Ponts couverts. It is also served by its own tramway stop on the Strasbourg tramway ("Musée d'Art moderne", line B).

Collections 
As of 28 March 2022, the museum's collections comprised 17,994 works in total, among which 1,799 paintings, 5,135 drawings, 905 sculptures, 4,218 prints and 3,661 photographs. Among famous artists, it comprises 427 works by Gustave Doré, 60 works by Jean Arp, 38 works by Victor Brauner, 29 works by Sophie Taeuber-Arp, 22 by Vassily Kandinsky, 10 by César Domela, 7 by Theo van Doesburg and several by Max Klinger, Käthe Kollwitz, Max Ernst, František Kupka; besides works by slightly less celebrated artists like Lou Albert-Lasard (2,004 works), François-Rupert Carabin (399 works), Marcelle Cahn (355 works), Lothar von Seebach (321 works), Jean-Désiré Ringel d'Illzach (250 works), etc.   A further accent is set by contemporary German painters (Markus Lüpertz, Eugen Schönebeck, Georg Baselitz, Jörg Immendorff, A. R. Penck, Albert Oehlen, Daniel Richter, Jonathan Meese, Thomas Scheibitz, Wolf Vostell etc.), who give a representative glimpse of an art genre which is otherwise rarely seen in France, especially on this scale.

The Musée d’Art Moderne et Contemporain de Strasbourg also owns the first cubist painting ever purchased by a public French collection, "Still Life" (1911) by Georges Braque, acquired in 1923, as well as the first painting by Dante Gabriel Rossetti purchased by a public French collection, "Joan of Arc Kissing the Sword of Deliverance" (1863), acquired in 1996 (now displayed in the Musée des Beaux-Arts).

Further important exhibited works of fine artists are (selected):

Camille Pissarro
Claude Monet
Auguste Rodin
Max Liebermann
Edward Burne-Jones
Auguste Rodin
Francis Picabia
Pablo Picasso
Alexander Archipenko
Wassily Kandinsky
Ossip Zadkine
Paul Klee
Max Ernst
Theo van Doesburg
Sophie Taeuber-Arp
Auguste Herbin
Alberto Magnelli
Jean Hélion
Asger Jorn
Arman
Gilles Aillaud
Malcolm Morley

The collection of Alsatian artists is also important, in terms of their number and at least their regional value, representing such genres as Art Nouveau, Expressionism and New Realism: Charles Spindler, René Beeh, Jean-Désiré Ringel d'Illzach, Henri Beecke, Luc Hueber, Martin Hubrecht and Camille Claus.

The photographic library of the museum has several thousand photographs, from the origin of photography up until today, including works of Nadar, Eugène Atget, Eadweard Muybridge, Étienne-Jules Marey, August Sander, Willy Maywald, Josef Sudek, Robert Mapplethorpe, Duane Michals and Jan Saudek. Regional photography is also acknowledged.

The artistic video collection has works of Bill Viola, Nam June Paik, Woody Vasulka, Olaf Breuning and many others.

Gallery

References

Literature 
Les collections du Musée d'art moderne et contemporain de la ville de Strasbourg, Éditions des musées de la ville de Strasbourg, February 2008,  in French
Museum of Modern and Contemporary Art, Éditions des musées de Strasbourg, Strasbourg, 2021,

External links
 
 Selected works 
 Online collection database, showing 17,994 works by 2,553 artists as of 28 March 2022 

Art museums and galleries in Strasbourg
Modern art museums in France
FRAME Museums
Art museums established in 1973
1973 establishments in France